The 1989 Victorian Football League finals series was the 93rd annual edition of the VFL/AFL final series, the Australian rules football tournament staged to determine the winner of the 1989 VFL Premiership season. The series ran over four weekends in September 1989, culminating with the 1989 VFL Grand Final at the Melbourne Cricket Ground on 30 September 1989.

Qualification 

After thoroughly dominating the competition the previous season, it again appeared that nothing could stand in the way of the  juggernaut. They moved to the top of the ladder in Round 4 after beating  and stayed there for the rest of the home-and-away season, finishing two games clear of second-placed  with 19 wins and a percentage of 153. Full-forward Jason Dunstall reached his second successive century of goals in a season against  in Round 18 and would finish the home-and-away season with 128 majors.
Under new coach Malcolm Blight,  qualified for their first VFL finals series since 1981 after a season where they broke various club and League scoring records. After their thrilling Round 6 shoot-out against Hawthorn (in which they set the League record for the highest losing score), the Cats went on a rampage, starting with three consecutive victories of over 100 points against ,  and Richmond. They strung together six further wins to consolidate their spot in the Top Five, eventually finishing the home-and-away season in third place with 16 wins and a new League record for the highest points aggregate with 2916 points, breaking Sydney's 1987 record. Paul Couch racked up over 600 disposals on his way to the Brownlow Medal, while prolific on-ballers Mark Bairstow, Andrew Bews and Garry Hocking would also consistently provide quality service to Geelong's spectacular forwards led by Gary Ablett, who was ably assisted by Gavin Exell, Barry Stoneham and Bill Brownless.
1988 runner-up  had a strong first half of the season, at one stage sitting second on the ladder after winning a hard-fought match against Hawthorn. In the end, the three-game buffer the Demons held over the teams battling for fifth spot was enough to secure them a third consecutive finals berth, despite losing five of their last six games in the home-and-away rounds. In the process, Melbourne became one of only a few teams to make the finals with a percentage of less than 100.

Matches

The 1989 VFL finals series was contested using the McIntyre final five system, which had been in use since 1972.

Week one (Qualifying and Elimination Finals)

Elimination Final (Melbourne v Collingwood)
The Elimination Final saw fourth-placed  host fifth-placed  at VFL Park. This marked the 22nd final between the two clubs, having previously met in the 1988 First Semi-Final which was won by Melbourne. They had contested seven Grand finals – in 1926, 1939, 1955, 1956, 1958, 1960 and 1964. Melbourne had won all but one of those Grand finals (when Collingwood famously prevented them from matching the four-in-a-row premiership feat in 1958), and the overall record was also in Melbourne's favour, with 15 wins, 5 losses and a draw in the 1928 Second Semi-Final.

Teams
This shows the teams as listed in The Football Record on the Thursday before the game. Both teams were missing key players due to injury; Melbourne were missing star key-position player Garry Lyon (who had been out for several weeks with a groin/thigh injury) and defender Danny Hughes (groin strain), while for Collingwood Darren Millane and Paul Hawke were unavailable, and full-forward Brian Taylor was omitted after admitting to coach Leigh Matthews that he was not fully fit. 

Match summary
Collingwood started well, with captain Shaw prolific early, gathering eight possessions in the opening 15 minutes and ably supported by Wright and Hrysoulakis. In the absence of Taylor, Starcevich provided a viable alternative with three first half goals. A five-goal burst at the start of the third quarter helped Melbourne gain a lead they would not relinquish. The siren eventually sounded with the Demons having won their third consecutive elimination final, while for Collingwood it was again a bitter disappointment. Matthews

Scorecard

Qualifying Final (Essendon v Geelong)
The Qualifying Final saw second-placed  host third-placed  at the Melbourne Cricket Ground.

Teams

Match Summary
Essendon's finals experience proved vital as they brushed aside a nervous Geelong team.

Scorecard

Week two (semi-finals)

First Semi-Final (Geelong vs Melbourne)
The First Semi-Final saw  host  at the MCG. It was the third time the two sides had met in a VFL final, the previous occasion being over 30 years ago in the 1954 Preliminary final, which was won by Melbourne. The Cats made a number of changes to the side following their disappointing performance in the Qualifying final. The Demons fielded an unchanged team from their Elimination Final victory.

Teams

Match Summary
After a week of criticism for their poor showing in the Qualifying final, Malcolm Blight demonstrated his ability to take calculated tactical risks to confuse the opposition and show his intent. Although Paul Couch and Mark Bairstow had been named in the starting line-up on the Thursday night, Blight anticipated that Melbourne would assign players to negate their influence. When the teams took their places on the field, the Demons were caught by surprise when Couch and Bairstow went to the bench and their places were taken in the middle by Mark Yeates and Damian Drum. After being physically dominated by Essendon, the Cats were keen to assert themselves from the beginning. 
The opening quarter was a fiery affair, with Geelong's excessive aggression threatening to backfire at times. While both sides had even scoring chances in the first half, Melbourne's wasted opportunities, especially in the second quarter when it kicked two goals and six behinds, were to prove costly. At the other end, Gary Ablett and Barry Stoneham were proving a handful for the Melbourne defence, having kicked seven of Geelong's eight goals for the half.   
After starting on the bench, Couch and Bairstow were brought on for the second half as Geelong looked to capitalize on their half-time lead. Ablett finished the game with seven goals and provided some unforgettable highlights, the first being a spectacular high mark, jumping into a pack and splitting it as he juggled the mark while falling to the ground. Almost as brilliant as his spectacular high mark over the pack was his one-handed mark in a one-on-one contest with Rod Grinter a few minutes later, which was finished with an excellent set shot goal.

Scorecard

Second Semi-Final (Hawthorn vs Essendon)
The Second Semi-Final saw  play  at VFL Park. The two clubs last met in the 1985 VFL Grand Final which was won by Essendon.

Teams

Match Summary
The highlight of the game was Brereton's perfectly executed hip-and-shoulder on Paul Vander Haar.

Scorecard

Week three (Preliminary Final)

Preliminary final (Essendon vs Geelong)
The Preliminary Final saw  play  at VFL Park on Saturday 23 September for the right to contest the grand final against Hawthorn. This marked the 400th VFL finals match since 1897, and it was somewhat appropriate that it should be contested by Essendon and Geelong, since both those teams had finished the inaugural League season first and second, respectively. Essendon were forced to make a number of changes to the starting team, with Salmon, Harvey, Duckworth and Vander Haar all unavailable. For Geelong, there was only one change to the team which had beaten Melbourne the previous week; Robert Scott was selected to replace the suspended Mark Yeates.

Teams

Match summary
In a dramatic 170-point turnaround, Geelong thrashed Essendon by 94 points. Essendon started well, leading by 11 points midway through the first quarter before Geelong took complete control. Blight again showed his willingness to experiment with positioning by playing his two half-forward flankers in defence, allowing his forwards more space. Gary Ablett led the way with eight goals.

Scorecard

Week four (Grand Final)

This was Hawthorn's seventh successive Grand Final appearance, while  were appearing in the big decider for the first time since 1967. The Hawks were chasing their 8th premiership and aiming to win back-to-back flags for the first time in the club's history, which they achieved in a high-scoring shootout. Gary Ablett Sr. tied Gordon Coventry's 1928 record for most goals in a grand final, kicking 9 for the game and 27 for the 1989 finals campaign; both remain as league records to this day. Despite Ablett's dominance, Geelong lost by 6 points. The game was famous for Brereton's inspirational comeback after having his ribs broken and his kidney bruised.

By the end of the match, Hawthorn had only 13 fit players on the field. Scottish soccer player Ray Stewart observed the game and was recorded to have said: "I would not play this game for a million dollars." The game is considered to be one of the best grand finals of all time. Rohan Connolly, writing for The Age, claimed it was the best grand final of all time.

References

Bibliography

External links

AFL finals series official website

Finals Series, 1989
Australian Football League